{{DISPLAYTITLE:C2H7NO2S}}
The molecular formula C2H7NO2S (molar mass: 109.15 g/mol) may refer to:

 1-Aminoethanesulfinic acid
 Ammonium thioglycolate
 Dimethylsulfuramidous acid
 Ethanesulfonamide
 2-Hydroxyethanesulfinamide
 Hypotaurine
 N-Methoxymethanesulfinamide
 N-Methylmethanesulfonamide
 1-(Methylsulfonyl)methanamine